Melanie Perkins (born 13 May 1987) is an Australian billionaire technology entrepreneur, who is the chief executive officer and co-founder of Canva.

Perkins is one of the youngest female CEOs of a tech start-up valued over 1 billion. , Perkins was one of Australia's richest women.

Early life 
Melanie Perkins was born in Perth, Western Australia. She is the daughter of an Australian-born teacher and a Malaysian engineer of Filipino and Sri Lankan descent. She attended Sacred Heart College, a secondary school located in the northern Perth suburb of Sorrento. At high school, Perkins had aspirations of becoming a professional figure skater and would routinely wake up at 4:30 am to train. By the age of fourteen, she had started her first business, selling handmade scarves at shops and markets throughout Perth. She credits this experience with developing her entrepreneurial drive as ‘she never forgot the freedom and excitement from building a business.’

After high school, Perkins enrolled at the University of Western Australia, majoring in communications, psychology and commerce. At this time, Perkins was also a private tutor for students learning graphic design. She noticed the difficulties students had in learning design programs such as Adobe Photoshop, where it would often take students a semester at university to be introduced to basic features of these complex design programs. Perkins thought there was a business opportunity in making the design process easier. Her idea was to make a design platform where no technical experience was required. She dropped out of university at age 19 to pursue her first business with Cliff Obrecht, Fusion Books.

Career

Fusion Books 
Fusion Books was founded by Perkins and Obrecht in 2007. Fusion Books allowed students to design their own school yearbooks by using a simple drag-and-drop tool equipped with a library of design templates that could be populated with photos, illustrations, and fonts. Originally, Perkins wanted to develop software that made the entire design process easier but due to the competition with large companies and her lack of resources, she concluded ‘it did not seem the logical thing to do’. Perkins's mother was a teacher who would also co-ordinate the school yearbook. Perkins saw how much time was required to design a yearbook and thought the high level of consumer friction would make yearbooks a good niche to test the idea for Canva.

Started in the Duncraig living room of Perkins's mother, Obrecht would cold call schools in an attempt to get new clients for Fusion Books. Their parents would often help with printing the yearbooks. Over five years, Fusion Books grew into the largest yearbook company in Australia and expanded into France and New Zealand.

Formation of Canva 

Perkins and Obrecht were originally based in Perth. Perkins claims that she was rejected by over 100 local investors in Perth.

In 2011, prominent investor, Bill Tai visited Perth to judge a start-up competition. Perkins and Obrecht pitched Tai the initial idea for Canva over dinner. There were also other venture capitalists present including Rick Baker from Blackbird Ventures. They received no funding but became regular fixtures at gatherings hosted by Tai for investors and start-up founders. Some of these gatherings took place in Silicon Valley where Perkins and Obrecht met Lars Rasmussen, co-founder of Google Maps. He expressed interest in the idea but told the founders to ‘put everything on hold’ until they found a tech team of the calibre required. Rasmussen then became the tech adviser to the business where he introduced Perkins and Obrecht to Cameron Adams, an ex-Google employee with the relevant technical expertise. Adams was initially not interested in joining the business as he was starting his own business called fluent.io, software attempting to disrupt email. Adams was in Silicon Valley trying to raise funds for his start-up when Perkins sent him another email asking if he wanted to join the business. After that email, he agreed to join Canva, becoming its third founder and chief product officer.

Perkins is the CEO of one of the few ‘unicorn’ start-ups that are profitable.

Women in start-ups 
There was controversy surrounding the gender disparity in the technology industry as well as amongst start-ups, with one in four start-ups founded by a woman. Perkins is amongst the 2 percent of female CEOs of venture-backed companies. She wrote an article for people who feel like 'they are on the outside' and discussed her journey as a young entrepreneur in order to encourage people from diverse backgrounds to pursue big dreams and concentrate on their goals. Perkins has implemented policies at Canva that eliminate bias in the hiring process, that has resulted in Canva obtaining 41 percent female representation, significantly higher than the industry average of 28 percent.

Personal life 
Perkins took an interest in kite surfing when she discovered many prominent venture capitalists use this as a way to network with founders. She would regularly kite-surf with venture capitalist Bill Tai. Perkins has also travelled the world extensively and credits a trip to India as a life-changing experience.

In 2019, Obrecht proposed to Perkins on a holiday in Turkey's backpacker-friendly Cappadocia region. The engagement ring was $30. The couple have been critical of materialism with Obrecht stating ‘what is the point of hoarding stuff’. They have expressed a desire to donate most of their fortune to charity. Perkins and Obrecht married in January 2021 on Rottnest Island. In November 2021, they joined the Giving Pledge, committing at least half of their fortune to philanthropic purposes.

Net worth 
In 2020 Forbes named Perkins as one of the world's "Top Under 30 of the Decade". Perkins first appeared on The Australian Financial Review Rich List in 2020 with a net worth of 3.43 billion. , The Australian Financial Review assessed her and Obrecht's joint net worth as 7.98 billion, on the 2021 Rich List; making them the tenth wealthiest Australians. As of January 31, 2022, Perkins estimated net worth is A$9.21 Billion (US$6.5B) as per Forbes Report.

Notes 
: Perkins' net worth is assessed in Financial Review Rich List as being held jointly with her spouse and business partner, Cliff Obrecht.

References

External links
 

Living people
1987 births
Australian billionaires
Australian company founders
Australian people of Filipino descent
Australian people of Malaysian descent
Australian people of Sri Lankan descent
21st-century Australian businesswomen
21st-century Australian businesspeople
Australian women chief executives
Australian women company founders
Female billionaires
People from Perth, Western Australia
People from Western Australia
Technology company founders